Rakovnik may refer to:

In the Czech Republic:
 Rakovník, a town in the Central Bohemian Region

In Slovenia:
 Rakovnik, Medvode, a settlement in the Municipality of Medvode
 Rakovnik, Šentjernej, a settlement in the Municipality of Šentjernej
 Rakovnik pri Birčni Vasi, a settlement in the Municipality of Novo Mesto
 Rakovnik pri Šentrupertu, a settlement in the Municipality of Šentrupert